Cecil Martin (died 3 October 1980) was an Antiguan cricketer. He played in two first-class matches for the Leeward Islands in 1966/67 and 1969/70.

See also
 List of Leeward Islands first-class cricketers

References

External links
 

Year of birth missing
1980 deaths
Antigua and Barbuda cricketers
Leeward Islands cricketers